Viktor Rjaksinski (born 17 October 1967 in Kremenchuk) is a Soviet and Ukrainian former cyclist.

Palmares
1990
2nd Overall Cinturón a Mallorca
3rd Overall Tour du Hainaut
1991
1st  World Amateur Road Race Championships
1st Overall Peace Race

References

1967 births
Living people
People from Kremenchuk
Ukrainian male cyclists
Soviet male cyclists
Sportspeople from Poltava Oblast